The Global Jurist of the Year Award or the Global Jurist Award is a recognition awarded annually by the Center for International Human Rights, an organization housed at the Bluhm Legal Clinic of Northwestern University School of Law. The award recognizes a sitting judge in recognition of that judge’s contribution to the advancement of international human rights law or international criminal law. Special account is taken of those who have shown outstanding dedication to the rule of law and courage in the face of adversity, including personal risk. Jurists from all nations and tribunals are eligible for consideration and nominations are accepted from the public, usually between January and March of the award year, with the final selection of the recipient being made by the faculty of the Center. The prize is presented during a visit by the recipient to Northwestern Law School during fall semester of the award year.

Recipients

References 

Human rights awards